Subodh Sarkar (born 1958 in Krishnanagar) is a Bengali poet, writer and editor, and a reader in English literature at City College, Kolkata. He is a recipient of the prestigious Sahitya Akademi Award.

Biography

Subodh Sarkar, born in 1958, is a noted Indian Bengali poet, editor, translator and Associate Professor in English at City College, Calcutta University. His first book of poems was published in the late 70s. He received the West Bengal Bangla Academy Award for poetry in 2000. His PhD is on the hyphenated identities of Indian American women writers writing in English. He visited Russia and Turkey as a member of the Indian Writers’ delegation organized by Sahitya Academy in 2010. Sarkar is former Editor of Indian Literature, Sahitya Academy, New Delhi. Recipient of National Sahitya Academy Award 2013 and Nazrul Award from Kabi Sangshad Bangladesh 2014.  He married Mallika Sengupta. He is a recipient of Bangabhushan from the Govt. of West Bengal. He received D.Lit from G.B.University, W.Bengal Gangadhar Meher National Award from Sambalpur University 2016. He has been the chairman of the Kobita Academy( Poetry Academy), Government of West Bengal In 2016.

Awards and honours
 Sahitya Akademi Award (2013) for Dwaipayan Hrader Dhare

List of publications
Books of poems:

 Chihh, Kalkata, Ananda Publishers, 1993, 
 Bhalo Jaygata Kothae, Kolkata, Ananda Publishers, 2001,
 Manipurer Ma, Kolkata, Ananda Publishers, 2005,

References

External links
 

Writers from Kolkata
1958 births
Living people
Bengali Hindus
Bengali writers
20th-century Bengalis
21st-century Bengalis
Bengali poets
Bengali male poets
20th-century Bengali poets
21st-century Bengali poets
Recipients of the Sahitya Akademi Award in Bengali
Recipients of the Gangadhar National Award
Indian male writers
Indian editors
Indian magazine editors
Indian translators
Indian poets
Indian male poets
University of Calcutta alumni
Academic staff of the University of Calcutta
Academic staff of City College, Kolkata
20th-century Indian poets
21st-century Indian poets
20th-century Indian writers
21st-century Indian writers
20th-century Indian male writers
21st-century Indian male writers
20th-century Indian translators
21st-century Indian translators
Poets from West Bengal
People from Krishnagar
People from Nadia district